Faiz bin Khaleed (born September 15, 1980 in Kuala Lumpur, Malaysia) is a Malaysian  military dentist with the Malaysian Armed Forces. In September 2006, he was selected as one of two final candidates to undergo astronaut training in Star City as part of the Angkasawan program. The other candidate was Sheikh Muszaphar Shukor.

Faiz received his early education in St. John's Institution, Kuala Lumpur.

In 2007, Sheikh Muszaphar was selected to fly to the International Space Station with Expedition 16 on board the Soyuz TMA-11 in October 2007.

Faiz  still might go to space if Malaysia decides to proceed with a second space flight.

On 22 October 2007, Faiz was promoted to a Major in the Malaysian Armed Forces.  Faiz retired from Malaysian Armed Forces with last rank Major late 2013.

Personal life
Faiz was in a previous relationship with Malaysian television personality Nurul Syuhada Nurul Ain. The couple ended their relationship in 2011.

References

External links
 Official Programme site
 Spacefacts biography of Faiz Khaleed

Living people
1980 births
Malaysian dentists
Malaysian people of Malay descent
Malaysian Muslims
People from Kuala Lumpur
University of Malaya alumni